Lars Bergendahl (30 January 1909 – 22 June 1997) was a Norwegian cross-country skier who competed during the 1930s.

He won several medals at the FIS Nordic World Ski Championships. In 1937, Bergendahl earned golds in the 18 km cross country event and 4 × 10 km relay. In 1938, he earned a silver in the 4 × 10 km relay and a bronze in the 50 km Cross country event. In 1939, Bergendahl won the 50 km cross-country skiing event. Bergendahl won the men's 50 km at the Holmenkollen ski festival in 1940. Because of his successes, Bergendahl was awarded the Holmenkollen medal in 1939 (Shared with Sven Selånger and Trygve Brodahl.). His uncle, Lauritz, won the medal in 1910.

Bergendahl fought in the Norwegian Campaign following the German invasion of Norway in 1940. Together with other sportsmen Bergendahl served in the improvised ski unit Sørkedalen Company in April 1940.

Cross-country skiing results
All results are sourced from the International Ski Federation (FIS).

World Championships
 5 medals – (3 gold, 1 silver, 1 bronze)

References

External links

Holmenkollen medalists - click Holmenkollmedaljen for downloadable pdf file 
Holmenkollen winners since 1892 - click Vinnere for downloadable pdf file 

1909 births
1997 deaths
Holmenkollen medalists
Holmenkollen Ski Festival winners
Skiers from Oslo
Norwegian male cross-country skiers
Norwegian Army personnel of World War II
FIS Nordic World Ski Championships medalists in cross-country skiing